This is a list of aircraft in alphabetical order beginning with 'O'.

O

O'Bannon 
(Clyde & Ralph O'Bannon, 510 S Kenilworth Ave, Oak Park, IL)
 O'Bannon 31

O'Brien-Hudson 
 See Hudson & O'Brien

O'Hara 
(Robert O'Hara, San Fernando, CA)
 O'Hara 1977 Biplane

O'Malley 
(Thomas H O'Malley, N E Warren, OH)
 O'Malley 1 Pterodactyl

O'Neil 
(O'Neil Airplane Co, Carlyle, IL)
 O'Neill Magnum

O'Neill 
(Terrence O'Neill, Ft Wayne, IN)
 O'Neill Aristocraft II
 O'Neill Model W
 O'Neill Pea Pod

Oakland 
(Oakland Airmotive Co, Oakland, CA)
 Oakland Centaurus

OAW 
(Ostdeutsche Albatroswerke G.m.b.H.)
see:Albatros OAW

Oaxaca
(Oaxaca Aerospace / Raul and Rodrigo Fernandez)
 Oaxaca PE-210A Pegasus

Ochoa 
(V L Ochoa, Arlington, NJ)
 Ochoa Jersey Devil a.k.a. Jersey Mosquito

Oberlerchner 
(Josef Oberlerchner Holzindustrie / Ing. Fritz Birkner)
 Oberlerchner JOB 5
 Oberlerchner JOB 15
 Oberlerchner Mg 23

Odesaviaremservice 
 Odesaviaremservice C-9 Dolphin

Odier
(Antoine Odier - see: ESTA)

Oeffag 
( Österreichische Flugzeugfabrik AG)
Note: Öffag were allocated 50 series numbers for experimental and prototype aircraft.
 Oeffag 50.01
 Oeffag 50.02
 Oeffag 50.03 (C.II)
 Oeffag 50.04
 Oeffag 50.05
 Oeffag 50.06 (C.II)
 Oeffag 50.07 (C.II)
 Oeffag 50.08 (AF)
 Oeffag 50.09 (AF)
 Oeffag 50.10 (AF)
 Oeffag 50.11 (AF)
 Oeffag 50.12 (AF)
 Oeffag 50.13 (BF)
 Oeffag 50.14 (CF)
 Oeffag 50.15
 Oeffag series 51 (C.I)
 Oeffag series 52 (C.II)
 Oeffag series 52.5 (C.II)
 Oeffag series 53 (Albatros D.II(Oef))
 Oeffag series 53.2 (Albatros D.III(Oef))
 Oeffag series 153 (Albatros D.III(Oef))
 Oeffag series 253 (Albatros D.III(Oef))
 Oeffag series 54 (Friedrichshafen G.IIIa(Oef))
 Oeffag Va.53
 Oeffag Va.53.2
 Oeffag Va.153
 Oeffag Va.253
 Oeffag AF
 Oeffag BF
 Oeffag CF
 Oeffag G
 Oeffag H
 Oeffag K (Hansa-Brandenburg W.13 (Oef))
 Oeffag KG
 Oeffag C.I
 Oeffag C.II

Offierski
(Michael Offierski)
 Offierski O.2

Offpiste Limited
(Dursley, Gloucestershire, United Kingdom)
Offpiste Discovery

OFW
(Österreichische Flugzeugwerke GmbH / Ing. Otto Kauba)
 OFW OK-15

Oertz 
(Max Oertz)
 Oertz 1909 biplane
 1911 Oertz monoplane
 Oertz Taube IV
 Oertz V 5 Miltär Eindekker
 Oertz W 4
 Oertz W 5
 Oertz W 6 Flugschoner
 Oertz W 8

Ogawa 
(Saburo Ogawa)
 Ogawa No.1
 Ogawa No.2
 Ogawa No.3 Taxi-ing Trainer
 Ogawa No.5

Ogden 
((Henry H & Perry V) Ogden Aeronautical Corp, 1119 S Market St, Inglewood, CA)
 Ogden Osprey C a.k.a. PC
 Ogden Osprey PB a.k.a. Pirate
 Ogden Osprey PC a.k.a. C
 Ogden Pirate a.k.a. PB

ÕGL 
(Õhu- ja Gaasikaitse Liit - Air & Aircraft Workshop) Tallinn, Estonia
 ÕGL-1 Kai
 ÕGL-2
 ÕGL POD-1
 ÕGL PON-1 
 ÕGL PON-1A
 KOD-1 13 PON-1 license-built in Latvia by LKOD - Kara Ostas Darbnica
 ÕGL PON-2
 ÕGL PN-3
 ÕGL PTO-4

Oguri 
(Tsunetaro Oguri)
 Oguri-Curtiss Jenny Trainer
 Oguri No.2

Ohio 
(Ohio Aero Mfg Co (Pres: Judd Yoho), Youngstown, OH)
 Ohio Airmaster Coupe
 Ohio Youngster

Ohio 
(Ohio Aviation Research & Development Foundation)
 Ohio 1950's Monoplane

Ohm & Stoppelbein 
(Richard Ohm and Gordon Stoppelbein, McLean, VA)
 Ohm & Stoppelbei Special

OIC 
(Owj Industrial Complex, Iran)
 OIC Tazarv

Okamura 
(Okamura Seiskujo Kabushiki Kaisha - Okamura Manufacturing Company Limited)
 Okamura N-52

Okay 
(Okay Airplane Co, Okay, OK (Pres: C N Martin))
 Okay SK-1

OKB-1 
 OKB-1 EF 131
 OKB-1 EF 132
 OKB-1 140
 OKB-1 150

Olagnier
(Rémy Olagnier)
 Olagnier 01

Oldfield 
(Barney Oldfield Aircraft Co, Cleveland, OH)
 Oldfield Baby Lakes

Oldtimer  
 Oldtimer M-17 Double Decker

Oleson 
(Clifton P "Ole" Oleson, IA)
 Oleson 1921 Biplane

Oleson 
((Tage C and Uffe K) Oleson Aircraft Inc, Wayne, MI)
 Oleson OM-1 Connecticut Yankee

Ollivier
(Charles Ollivier)
 Ollivier DR.100 Collivier

Olsen 
(Olsen Standard Aeroplane Co (OSACO), Tomahawk, WI)
 Curtiss-OSACO
 Olsen 1927 Monoplane
 OSACO 6

Olsen 
(Gordon L Olsen, Rosamond, CA)
 Olsen Nite Hawk
 Olsen Nite Star

Olsen-Jonasson
(Olsen-Jonasson)
 Olsen-Jonasson Ognin

Olsen-Thomas 
((Albert & Lars) Olsen-(Ward) Thomas, Middletown, NJ)
 Olsen-Thomas Parasol XP1-40

Olson 
(Olson Aircraft Corp, Wilmington, NC)
 Olson Ambassador

Olympic Ultralights
(Port Angeles, WA)
Olympic Desert Eagle

OMA SUD 
(OMA SUD SpA, Capua (CE), Italy)
 OMA SUD Redbird
 OMA SUD Skycar

OMAC 
(Old Man's Aircraft Company - OMAC Inc, Reno, NV)
 OMAC Laser 300
 OMAC-1

OMAREAL
(Officina de Manutenção e Recuperção de Avioes, Ltda.)
 OMAREAL Casmuniz 52
 OMAREAL W-141

Omega 
(Omega Aircraft Corp)
 Omega BS-12
 Omega BS-12B
 Omega BS-12D-1
 Omega BS-12D-3
 Omega BS-12F
 Omega BS-12J
 Omega BS-14 Falcon
 Omega BS-17A Airliner

OMF
(Ostmecklenburgische Flugzeugbau)
 OMF-100-160 Symphony

Omni Weld 
(Omni-Weld Company)
 Omni Weld Questor

On Mark Engineering
 On Mark Executive
 On Mark Marketeer
 On Mark Marksman

Onciul 
(Radu Onciul)
 Onciul R.O.-1
 Onciul R.O.-2

OneAircraft
(Celje, Slovenia)
OneAircraft One

One Aviation
(Albuquerque, NM)
Eclipse 550
Eclipse 700
Kestrel K-350

ONERA 
(Office National d'Études et de Recherches Aérospatiales)
 ONERA Deltaviex

Ong 
((William) Ong Aircraft Corp, 838 Richards Rd, Kansas City, MO)
 Ong M-32-W Continental

Onishi
 Onishi OSG3

Orliński
(Roman Orliński)
Orliński RO-7 Orlik

Orta St. Hubert
(St.Hubert Aircraft Engineering Works - Mr. Pierre Baudoux and Mr. Jose Orta)
 Orta-St.Hubert G.1
 Orta-St.Hubert SG.1
 Orta-St.Hubert 135BO

OOS 
(Otdel Opytnogo Samolyetostroeniya - section for experimental aircraft construction)
 OOS Stal-2
 OOS Stal-3
 OOS Stal-5
 OOS Stal-11
 OOS Aviatourist
 OOS KhB

Opel 
(Fritz von Opel)
 Opel RAK.1 (a.k.a. Opel-Hatry RAK.1 or Opel-Sander RAK.1)

Opener, Inc.
(Palo Alto, California, United States)
Opener BlackFly

Öppulennuk 
()
 Öppulennuk PTO-4

Optery X
(Optery X Engineering Ltd.)
 Optery X MXIII

Option Air 
(Option Air Reno (Pres: Carl O. Barlow), Reno, NV)
 Option Air Acapella 100-L
 Option Air Acapella 200-L
 Option Air Acapella 200-S

Oravecz
(Béla Oravecz)
 Oravecz-1
 Oravecz-2

Orbital Sciences Corporation 
 Orbital Sciences X-34

Orel
(Orel Aircraft)
 Orel VH2 Streamline

Orenco 
(Ordnance Engineering Co, Long Island, NY)
 Orenco A
 Orenco B
 Orenco C
 Orenco C-4 Cross Country
 Orenco D
 Orenco D-2
 Orenco E-2
 Orenco F
 Orenco F-4 Tourister
 Orenco H-2
 Orenco H-3 Commercial
 Orenco I Sport Boat
 Orenco IL-1
 Orenco PT
 Orenco PW-1
 Orenco PW-1A
 Orenco PW-3

Orlando Helicopter Airways
(Orlando Helicopter Airways, Inc, DeLand, FL)
Orlando Deland Travel Air 2000

Orličan
(Orlican Národní Podnik)
 Orličan L-40 Meta Sokol
 Orlican VSO 10
 Orlican VT-16 Orlik
 Orlican VT-116 Orlik
 Orličan Ornis M7

Orlogsværftet / Flyvetroppernes Værksteder 
(Orlogsværftet / Flyvetroppernes Værksteder - Naval dockyard / Flying Corps’ workshops)
 Orlogsvaerftet HM.I
 Orlogsvaerftet HM.II
 Orlogsvaerftet H.B.I
 Orlogsvaerftet H.B.II
 Orlogsvaerftet L.B.I
 Orlogsvaerftet L.B.II
 Orlogsvaerftet L.B.IV
 Orlogsvaerftet L.B.V
 Orlogsvaerftet L.M.I
 Orlogsvaerftet Mågen 17
 Orlogsvaerftet F.B.II
 Orlogsvaerftet F.B.III
 Orlogsvaerftet F.B.IV
 Orlogsvaerftet F.B.V
 Tøjhusværkstederne- Orlogsværftet H-Maskine

Orme 
(Harry A Orme, Washington, DC)
 Orme 1908 Biplane

Ort 
(Daniel J Ort, Dearborn/Detroit, MI)
 Ort Sport

Orel Aircraft
(Selles-Saint-Denis, France)
Orel VH2 Streamline

Orta St.Hubert
(José Orta / Ecole d'Aviation de St. Hubert
 Orta St Hubert SG.1
 Orta St.Hubert G.1

Ortego 
(Leo Ortego, Alexandria, LA)
 Ortego 1927 Helicopter

ORYOL-FESTIP 
 ORYOL-FESTIP Concept Plane

OSA 
(Officine Sommese Aeronautica)
 O.S.A. 135
 O.S.A. 200

OSKBES 
(Moscow Aviation institute)
MAI-223
MAI-208
MAI-890
MAI-920

Osprey 
(George Pereira  / Osprey Aircraft)
 Osprey GP-4
 Osprey GP-5

Ostergaard 
(Ostergaard Airplane Works, Chicago, IL)
 Ostergaard 1919 Aeroplane

Ott 
(Delmar Ott, Napa, CA)
 Ott V-2 Special

Otto 
(Gustav Otto Flugmaschinenfabrik (from 1911) / Aeroplanbau Otto-Alberti (1910))

 Otto-Alberti Doppeldecker (based on a Farman biplane 1910)
 Otto Renn-Doppeldecker (1912)
 Otto M 1912 (a.k.a. Pusher Biplane)
 Otto B 1914
 Otto C
 Otto B.I
 Otto C.I 1915
 Otto C.II
 Otto W.II

Otto
(Otto Aviation Group LLC)
 Otto Celera 500L

Oulette 
(Albert Oulette, Sanford, ME)
 Oulette 1910 Biplane

Overcashier 
((Francis) Overcashier Airplane Co, 3515 Woodward, Detroit, MI)
 Overcashier JN-4
 Overcashier O-12
 Overcashier Special

Overland 
(Overland Airways Inc, Omaha, NE)
 Overland Model L
 Overland Sport 60

OWAM
(Oscar Wittenstein Aerodrom Milbertshofen - Dr. Otto Wittenstein)
 OWAM 1911 Eindecker

Owens 
(John Sidney Owens, Glenside, PA)
 Owens 1929 Biplane
 Owens 3-B-1

Owj Industrial Complex
 Owj Tazarve

Owl 
(George Owl, Gardena, CA)
 Owl Racer OR-65-2 Pogo and Yellow peril
 Owl Racer OR-70-1 Fang
 Owl Racer OR-71-1 Li'l Quickie

Ozaki 
(Yukiteru Ozaki)
 Ozaki Tractor Biplane
 Ozaki Soga-go

Ozone Gliders
(Le Bar-sur-Loup, France)
Ozone 6907
Ozone Addict
Ozone Alpina
Ozone Atom
Ozone Buzz
Ozone Cosmic Rider
Ozone Delta
Ozone Element
Ozone Enzo
Ozone FLX
Ozone Geo
Ozone Groundhog
Ozone Jomo
Ozone LM4
Ozone LM5
Ozone LM6
Ozone Mac Daddy Bi
Ozone Magnum
Ozone Mag2lite
Ozone Mantra
Ozone Mojo
Ozone Octane
Ozone Peak
Ozone Proton
Ozone Rush
Ozone Swift
Ozone Swiftmax
Ozone Trickster
Ozone Ultralite
Ozone Vibe
Ozone Vulcan
Ozone XXLite
Ozone Zeno

References

Further reading

External links

 List of aircraft (O)